Jaffas are a New Zealand registered trademark for a small round sweet consisting of a solid, orange flavoured chocolate centre with a hard covering of red coloured confectionery. The name derives from the Jaffa orange. The sweet is part of both Australiana and Kiwiana.

James Stedman-Henderson's Sweets Ltd, under their brand Sweetacres, released Jaffas onto the Australian and New Zealand markets in 1931. The confectionery is currently made in Australia by Allen's lollies, a division of Nestlé and in New Zealand by RJ's Confectionery in Levin.

A number of Australian and New Zealand amateur sporting groups use Jaffas as a team name. In Dunedin, New Zealand every year a vast quantity of Jaffas is raced down Baldwin Street – the world's steepest residential street, according to the Guinness World Records – as part of the Cadbury Chocolate carnival, which is held in conjunction with the New Zealand International Science Festival. The initial number of 20,000 Jaffas has now been increased to 30,000 Jaffas. Similarly, "rolling Jaffas down the aisle" at the movie theatre is also a piece of Australian and New Zealand folklore, to the point that it was included in advertising in the 1970s.

The Australian supermarket business Coles has a generic version called "Choc Orange Balls"; similar products are made by other manufacturers.

See also
 Jaffa Cakes

References

External links

 Chocolate Carnival

Australian confectionery
Brand name confectionery
New Zealand confectionery